Shavelson is a surname. Notable people with the surname include:

Jared Shavelson, American drummer
Melville Shavelson (1917–2007), American film director, producer, screenwriter, and author
Richard Shavelson, educational psychologist